Daniel Bell (1919–2011) was an American sociologist and professor at Harvard University.

Daniel Bell may also refer to:
 Daniel Bell (Australian swimmer) (born 1984), Australian Paralympic swimmer
 Daniel Bell (footballer) (born 1985), Australian rules footballer
 Daniel Bell (freedman), American freed slave who helped plan the Pearl incident
 Daniel Bell (musician) (born 1967), American minimal techno disc jockey
 Daniel Bell (field hockey), South Africa field hockey player
 Daniel Bell (New Zealand swimmer) (born 1990), New Zealand Olympic swimmer
 Daniel A. Bell (born 1964), Canadian political scientist
 Daniel W. Bell (1891–1971), American civil servant and businessman
 Dan Bell (born 1977), American filmmaker

See also
 Daniel Bell Wakefield (1798–1858), New Zealand judge
 Daniel Bell-Drummond (born 1993), English cricketer
 Daniel Belle (born 1983), Australian Idol contestant